Gustav Kleikamp (born 8 March 1896 in Fiddichow an der Oder; died 13 September 1952 in Mülheim an der Ruhr) was a German naval officer, and a Vizeadmiral in Nazi Germany's Kriegsmarine.

Imperial German Navy

After basic training, he transferred to Marineschule Mürwik on 3 April 1914.

From March 1918 he attended Ubootschule and later served as watch officer on  until October 1918, when he became clerical officer of the 1. U-Kreuzerflottille until the end of the year.

Reichsmarine
Kleikamp remained with the navy after the collapse of the monarchy in November 1918, serving in the Marine-Brigade Ehrhardt. He received a provisional promotion to Oberleutnant zur See on 7 January 1920, which was confirmed on 14 May 1921.

After a year as commanding officer, Kleikamp joined the faculty at the Marinenachrichtenschule on 1 October 1923. Having received promotion to Kapitänleutnant in 1925, he joined the battleship  on 24 September 1926 as Rollenoffizier.

From 28 September 1928 Kleikamp was the officer responsible for training and education on the cruiser , before being appointed director of the Nachrichtenmittelversuchsanstalt on 11 February 1930. He served in this position until October 1932, when he was appointed naval liaison officer to the Wehrkreiskommando I in Königsberg, having been promoted to Korvettenkapitän. Following the Nazi Party takeover in January 1933, Kleikamp became 4. Admiralstabsoffizier in the Fleet Command.

Kriegsmarine

On 26 April 1939, having been promoted to Kapitän zur See a year earlier, was given command of Schleswig-Holstein, which had returned from a tour to South America a few weeks earlier. Schleswig-Holstein was slated to be retired and converted into a remotely controlled target ship, but preparations for the Invasion of Poland, saw the ship assigned a war mission.

Late in August 1939, Schleswig-Holstein was sent to Danzig on a friendship visit, in place of the cruiser Königsberg. The visit was a ruse to bring a landing force to Danzig in order to neutralize Polish fortifications in the harbour. For this purpose Schleswig-Holstein had received 60 men with five 2 cm AA guns and six machine guns.

World War II
On 1 September 1939 at 04:45, Kleikamp gave the order for the attack on the Westerplatte and two minutes later the first shells left the barrels of Schleswig-Holsteins 28 cm guns. 

In April 1940 Schleswig-Holstein was flagship of Kriegsschiffgruppe 7, which was tasked with the occupation of the Danish ports Nyborg and Korsør.

After the Fall of France Kleikamp was appointed Chef der Seebefehlsstelle Calais double-hatting as Chef der Transportflotte C for Operation Sea Lion on 29 August 1940. After the invasion of Britain was cancelled, Kleikamp transferred to Naval High Command as Chef der Militärischen Amtsgruppe in Hauptamt Kriegsschiffbau, a position he held until 21 February 1943.

From March 1943 until the end of 1944, Kleikamp, having been promoted to Konteradmiral and ultimately Vizeadmiral, served as Kommandierender Admiral in den Niederlanden. From 1 January until 14 March 1945, he was at the disposal of the Oberbefehlshaber des Marineoberkommandos Nord. On 15 March 1945 he took over as Kommandierender Admiral Deutsche Bucht.

Post-War
Kleikamp became a Prisoner of War on 7 May 1945 and remained in British custody until 18 April 1947. In poor health, he was unemployed until Spring 1952, when he joined Hugo Stinnes in Mülheim an der Ruhr. There he died on 13 September 1952.

Dates of rank

Seekadett – 1 April 1913
Fähnrich zur See – 3 April 1914
Leutnant zur See – 18 September 1915
Oberleutnant zur See – 14 May 1921 (dated 7 January 1920)
Kapitänleutnant – 1 February 1925
Korvettenkapitän – 1 October 1932
Fregattenkapitän – 1 October 1936
Kapitän zur See – 1 April 1938
Konteradmiral – 1 April 1942
Vizeadmiral – 1 October 1943

Military orders and decoration
Clasp to the Iron Cross, 1st class
Hanseatenkreuz (Hamburg)
German Cross in Gold

Bibliography

External links
Gustav Kleikamp

1896 births
1952 deaths
Vice admirals of the Kriegsmarine
Imperial German Navy personnel of World War I
Reichsmarine personnel
20th-century Freikorps personnel
German prisoners of war in World War II held by the United Kingdom
People from Gryfino County